Ryan Rau (born July 30, 1990) is a former American football linebacker. After playing college football for Portland State, he was signed by the Philadelphia Eagles as an undrafted free agent in 2012.

Professional career

Philadelphia Eagles
Rau was signed by the Philadelphia Eagles as an undrafted free agent following the 2012 NFL Draft on June 14, 2012. After playing the entire preseason with the team, he was released during final roster cuts on August 31. He was re-signed to the team's practice squad on September 1, and was promoted to the active roster on December 8. Rau made his NFL debut on December 9 against the Tampa Bay Buccaneers. Rau was released from his contract on April 11, 2013.

Cleveland Browns
Rau was claimed off waivers by the Cleveland Browns on April 12, 2013. He was released on May 21, 2013.

Carolina Panthers
Rau was signed by the Carolina Panthers on May 22, 2013. On August 24, 2013, he was waived by the Panthers.

References

External links
 Edmonton Eskimos bio
 Philadelphia Eagles bio
 Portland State Vikings bio

1990 births
Living people
American football linebackers
Carolina Panthers players
Cleveland Browns players
Edmonton Elks players
Miami Dolphins players
People from Folsom, California
Philadelphia Eagles players
Players of American football from California
Portland State Vikings football players
Sportspeople from Sacramento County, California